Gay is an unincorporated community in Jackson County, West Virginia, United States. Gay has a post office with the ZIP Code of 25244.

One Mr. Gay, an early postmaster, gave the community his last name.

References

Unincorporated communities in Jackson County, West Virginia
Unincorporated communities in West Virginia